Leiosyrinx matsukumai is a species of sea snail, a marine gastropod mollusk in the family Raphitomidae.

Description
The length of the shell attains 27 mm.

Distribution
This marine species was found in deep water off the Philippines and in the East China Sea.

References

 Bouchet, P. & Sysoev, A., 2001. Typhlosyrinx-like tropical deep-water turriform gastropods (Mollusca, Gastropoda, Conoidea). Journal of Natural History 35: 1693-1715

External links
 Gastropods.com: Leiosyrinx matsukumai
 
 Intergovernmental Oceanographic Commission (IOC) of UNESCO. The Ocean Biogeographic Information System (OBIS)

matsukumai
Gastropods described in 2001